tRNA (cytidine56-2'-O)-methyltransferase (aTrm56, tRNA ribose 2'-O-methyltransferase aTrm56, PAB1040 (gene)) is an enzyme with systematic name S-adenosyl-L-methionine:tRNA (cytidine56-2'-O)-methyltransferase. This enzyme catalyses the following chemical reaction

 S-adenosyl-L-methionine + cytidine56 in tRNA  S-adenosyl-L-homocysteine + 2'-O-methylcytidine56 in tRNA

The archaeal enzyme specifically catalyses the S-adenosyl-L-methionine dependent 2'-O-ribose methylation of cytidine at position 56 in tRNA transcripts.

References

External links 
 

EC 2.1.1